The Football Association of Ireland Women's Cup is the senior cup competition for women's association football in the Republic of Ireland. It is commonly known as the Women's FAI Cup, the WFAI Cup, or prior to 2001, the Ladies FAI Cup or the LFAI Cup. Organised by the Women's Football Association of Ireland, like the Women's National League, the Cup is currently sponsored by EVOKE.ie and is known as the EVOKE.ie FAI Women's Cup. Previous sponsors include Continental Tyres, Umbro and Brother International.

History

Antecedents
Two reports in the Kilkenny People suggest that Evergreen (Kilkenny) defeated Avengers (Dublin) in a 1973 final. Two 1974 articles in the Irish Independent and Sunday Independent report that Anne O'Brien won the Drumcondra Cup with All-Stars (Dublin) in 1972. A 1985 article in the Munster Express, marking Benfica's twenty year anniversary, claims the club first played in a national Cup as early as in 1968.

Early years
Although the RSSSF archives only list finals from 1989, a match programme from a 1978 international between the Republic of Ireland and France confirmed that the Ladies FAI Cup was first played for in 1975 with Limerick defeating C.S.O. (Dublin) 2–1 in the final.  Records from the early 1980s are more clear and during this period the three strongest teams were Dublin Castle, Benfica and Rathfarnham United. The former two clubs were both members of the Ladies League of Ireland. Dublin Castle was founded in the mid-1970s as a works team by Margaret Griffin, a former camogie player from Ennis, County Clare who later became a Republic of Ireland international. At the time Griffin was working for the Irish Revenue Commissioners based at Dublin Castle.

Benfica won the cup for the third time in 1993 in controversial circumstances. College Corinthians originally defeated Benfica 1–0 in the final. However a replay was held after it was discovered that Corinthians had fielded two unregistered players. In the replay, a fifteen year old Ciara Grant scored twice as Benfica won 3–0 at Kilcohan Park.

DWSL monopoly
Following the emergence of the Dublin Women's Soccer League in 1993, its member clubs, most notably Shamrock Rovers and UCD, dominated the competition. This monopoly was briefly broken in 2006 and 2007 by the representative teams of two regional women's leagues. A team representing the Mayo Ladies League defeated UCD in the 2006 final and in 2007 the Galway Ladies League defeated Raheny United. Between 2008 and 2011 the DWSL dominance was restored with victories by St Francis, Peamount United and St. Catherine's.

UEFA Women's Cup
Between 2001 and 2010 the FAI Women's Cup served as a qualifier for the UEFA Women's Cup. In 2002–03, after winning the 2001 cup, Shamrock Rovers became the first women's team to represent the Republic of Ireland in Europe. UCD became the second Republic of Ireland team to qualify for Europe after winning the cup. UCD played in the 2003–04, 2004–05 and 2005–06 UEFA Women's Cups. The Mayo Ladies League, the Galway Ladies League, St Francis and Peamount United all represented the Republic of Ireland in Europe after winning the cup.

In 2005 Dundalk City won the FAI Women's Cup and as a result qualified for the 2006–07 UEFA Women's Cup. However, in 2006 a split developed within Dundalk City over a plan for the club to fully merge with Dundalk F.C. This saw the emergence of two separate women's teams. Dundalk City was re-established as an independent club while Dundalk W.F.C. became affiliated with the League of Ireland club. Following complications that resulted from the split, it was Dundalk W.F.C. that went on to represent the Republic of Ireland in the UEFA Women's Cup.

Women's National League era
The establishment of the Women's National League in 2011–12 led to a revamp for the FAI Women's Cup. Played between August and November, it serves as a warm up competition for the WNL season. Between 2013 and 2019 the final was staged as part of double header at the Aviva Stadium along with the men's FAI Cup final. This idea had previously been tried out in 2004 and 2005 when Lansdowne Road hosted both finals on the same day. Since 2013 the final has also been broadcast live on RTÉ Two. In 2015 the double header system caused controversy when the FAI Women's Cup final went to extra-time and penalties. During the penalty shoot-out, Cork City F.C. players began their warm up preparations for the men's FAI Cup on the pitch.

From the 2020 season onwards, the final was staged at Tallaght Stadium on a separate day to the men's final.

List of finals

Notes

List of winners by club
Dublin Castle and Castle Rovers/Shamrock Rovers have won the cup the most times, each winning the competition six times.

Notes

References

External links
 

Women's
Women's
Women's association football competitions the Republic of Ireland
Ire
FAI Women's Cup